{{Infobox sports rivalry
 | name                     = Broncos–Chargers rivalry
 | team1                     = Denver Broncos
 | team2                     = Los Angeles Chargers
 | team1logo                     = Denver Broncos wordmark.svg
 | team2logo                     = Los Angeles Chargers 2020 wordmark.svg
 | first contested                     = October 16, 1960Chargers 23, Broncos 19
 | mostrecent                     = January 8, 2023Broncos 31, Chargers 28
 | nextmeeting                     = 2023
 | total                     = 126
 | largestvictory                     = Broncos, 38–3 (1997)Chargers: 58–20 (1963), 41–3 (2007)
 | currentstreak                     = Broncos, 1 (2022–present)
 | longeststreak                     = Broncos, 7 (1975–1978)Chargers, 6 (1963–1966)
 | series                     = Broncos, 71–55–1
 | postseason                     = Broncos, 1–0

 | section_header                     = Playoff and Championship success
 | section_info                     = AFL Championships 
Chargers: 1963

Super Bowl Championships (3)
Broncos:  (XXXII),  (XXXIII),  (50)

AFL Western Division Championships (5)Chargers – 1960, 1961, 1963, 1964, 1965

AFC Wild Card Berths (15) 

Super Bowl appearances (9)
 Chargers (1) – 
}}

The Broncos–Chargers rivalry is a National Football League (NFL) rivalry between the Denver Broncos and the Los Angeles Chargers. Since the American Football League was established in 1960, the Broncos and Chargers have shared the same division, first being the AFL Western Conference, and since the AFL–NFL merger, both clubs have competed in the American Football Conference (AFC) West division.

The Broncos lead the overall series 71–55–1.  The teams have met once in the playoffs, a 24–17 Broncos win in the 2013 AFC Divisional Round.

Notable moments

1985–2006
 November 17, 1985 Broncos' safety Dennis Smith blocked two straight field goal attempts in overtime, after the Chargers had advanced the football to the Broncos' 23-yard line in the first overtime possession. On 4th and 4 from the Broncos' 23, Smith blocked Bob Thomas' initial field goal attempt, only to have it negated due to a timeout being called by teammate Mike Harden prior to the kick. Following the timeout, Thomas attempted a second kick, and this was also blocked by Smith and returned by Louis Wright for a 60-yard touchdown for a 30–24 Broncos' overtime win at Mile High Stadium.
 September 4, 1994: The Broncos jumped out to a 24–6 lead at Mile High Stadium on the Chargers in the second quarter, however, the Chargers responded, and took a 27–24 lead at half time, after safety Stanley Richard returned a John Elway interception 99 yards for a touchdown just before halftime. The Chargers later sealed the victory after linebacker Junior Seau recovered a fumble by Elway in the game's closing seconds.
 September 14, 2003: The Broncos routed the Chargers 37–13 at Qualcomm Stadium. However, the game is notable for a uniform mix-up, in which the Broncos came to the stadium in their road white jerseys, when the host Chargers were planning to wear white, and were supposed to be the team that declared their uniform color. The Broncos were fined $25,000 as a result, and when the two teams met at Invesco Field at Mile High later that season in Week 11 (November 16), the NFL allowed the Chargers to choose their uniform color in advance, and they chose navy blue, forcing the Broncos to wear their white jerseys at home for the first time since .
 December 10, 2006: The Chargers routed the Broncos 48–20 at Qualcomm Stadium, in which Chargers' running back LaDainian Tomlinson set a new NFL record for touchdowns in a single season, with 28.

2007–2011
 December 24, 2007: In the fourth quarter of a Monday night game at Qualcomm Stadium, Broncos' quarterback Jay Cutler was involved in a verbal scuffle with Chargers' quarterback Philip Rivers and linebacker Matt Wilhelm, with Rivers taunting Cutler and Wilhelm mocking a "waving" gesture. Broncos' cornerback Champ Bailey took exception to Rivers' taunting of Cutler.
 September 14, 2008: With 52 seconds left in the fourth quarter, the Chargers were leading 38–31 in Denver. The Broncos hiked the ball on 2nd-and-goal from the Chargers' 1-yard line. Jay Cutler rolled out to the right and fumbled the football before he brought his arm forward, which was recovered by Chargers' linebacker Tim Dobbins. However, referee Ed Hochuli called the play dead as he believed it to be an incomplete pass, so the ball was returned to the Broncos at the 10-yard line (the spot where the ball hit the ground). Two plays later, on 4th-and-goal from the 4, Cutler threw a touchdown pass to wide receiver Eddie Royal to make the score 38–37. Instead of kicking an extra point to tie the game and send it to overtime, Broncos' head coach Mike Shanahan opted for a 2-point conversion. Cutler completed the conversion with another pass to Royal, giving the Broncos a 39–38 victory.
 December 28, 2008: The Broncos and Chargers met in the  regular-season finale in San Diego, with the winner clinching the AFC West title. Three weeks earlier, the Broncos were 8–5 and the Chargers were 5–8, with the Broncos losing their next two games and the Chargers winning their next two to pull to within one game of the Broncos for the division lead. Three and a half months after the aforementioned controversial Broncos' win in Denver, the Chargers exacted revenge, with an emphatic 52–21 win that not only completed a monumental Broncos' season-ending collapse, but also denied the Broncos a playoff berth. The two teams finished the 2008 season tied for first-place in the AFC West, each with an 8–8 record, however, the Chargers won the division based on a better record against AFC West divisional opponents (5–1 to the Broncos' 3–3). This was also Mike Shanahan's last game as the Broncos' head coach, as he was fired two days later after 14 seasons.
 November 27, 2011: Quarterback Tim Tebow led the Broncos to a 16–13 win at Qualcomm Stadium in overtime, with kicker Matt Prater nailing a 37-yard field goal with 29 seconds left. Earlier in overtime, the Broncos blocked a 53-yard attempt by Chargers' kicker Nick Novak, however, Broncos' head coach John Fox called a timeout prior to the kick. Novak subsequently missed the second attempt.

2012–present
 October 15, 2012: Trailing 24–0 at halftime after back-to-back special teams turnovers and an interception returned for a touchdown, quarterback Peyton Manning led the Broncos to a stunning 35–24 comeback win in San Diego. Three second-half interceptions and two lost fumbles by Chargers' quarterback Philip Rivers swung the momentum toward the Broncos' favor, as Manning and the Broncos capitalized on each Chargers' mistake. Manning went 13/14 for 167 yards and three touchdowns in the second half, hitting Demaryius Thomas on a 29-yard score with 10:56 left in the third quarter to get the Broncos on the scoreboard. Following a 65-yard touchdown on a fumble recovery by cornerback Tony Carter, the Broncos suddenly found themselves down only 10 as the Chargers watched their comfortable halftime lead dwindle. Manning added two more touchdown passes in the fourth quarter, finding Eric Decker on a 7-yard score and then connecting with Brandon Stokley on a 21-yard pitch and catch to give the Broncos a 28–24 lead with 9:03 left. Cornerback Chris Harris, Jr. sealed the comeback with a 46-yard interception return to put the Broncos up 35–24 with 2:06 left. The defense added one final takeaway as Rivers fumbled in the game's final minute to end what was certainly an instant Monday Night Football classic.
 September 11, 2017: The Chargers were attempting a game-tying 44-yard field goal at Sports Authority Field at Mile High with five seconds left in the game, after trailing 24–7 to begin the fourth quarter. However, Chargers' placekicker Younghoe Koo's field goal attempt was blocked by Broncos' defensive end Shelby Harris for a Broncos' 24–21 win. Koo's initial field goal attempt was good, but it was nullified as the result of Broncos' head coach Vance Joseph calling a timeout in order to ice the kicker, forcing a second attempt.
 October 22, 2017: The Chargers shutout the Broncos with a score of 21-0 in a win. This was the Broncos' first shutout loss in 25 years, since the 1992 season. Chargers' wide receiver Travis Benjamin was instrumental in the victory with a 65 yard punt return for a touchdown and a 42 yard touchdown catch. 
 November 18, 2018: The Chargers were leading 19–7 in the third quarter at StubHub Center, and were threatening to pull away from the Broncos. However, linebacker Von Miller swung the momentum in the Broncos' favor, with an interception of a screen pass by Chargers' quarterback Philip Rivers, returning the football 40 yards to the Chargers' 18-yard line. This set up a 3-yard touchdown run by running back Royce Freeman to pull the Broncos to within a 19–14 deficit. Following a 2-yard touchdown by running back Phillip Lindsay (with an unsuccessful two-point attempt) and a go-ahead 30-yard field goal by Chargers' placekicker Michael Badgley, Broncos' quarterback Case Keenum engineered a game-winning drive, culminating in a 34-yard field goal by placekicker Brandon McManus as time expired, for a 23–22 Broncos' victory.
 December 1, 2019: After a 46-yard field goal by Chargers' placekicker Michael Badgley tied the score at 20–20 with only 14 seconds remaining at Empower Field at Mile High, the game appeared to be headed to overtime. However, instead of a kneel-down, Broncos' rookie quarterback Drew Lock, in his NFL debut, launched a deep pass attempt to wide receiver Courtland Sutton, who drew a pass interference penalty on cornerback Casey Hayward at the Chargers' 35-yard line. This set up Broncos' placekicker Brandon McManus with the game-winning 53-yard field goal as time expired.
 November 1, 2020: The Broncos trailed 24–3 in front of limited capacity at Empower Field at Mile High, and were stymied by the Chargers' defense in the first half. Entering the third quarter, the Broncos had scored only two touchdowns in the previous ten quarters. However, running back Phillip Lindsay ignited a rally with a 55-yard touchdown run, and quarterback Drew Lock threw a 9-yard touchdown pass to tight end Albert Okwuegbunam to draw the Broncos to within a 24–17 deficit early in the fourth quarter. After Lock's second touchdown pass—a 40-yarder to wide receiver DaeSean Hamilton, coupled with two field goals by Chargers' placekicker Michael Badgley, the Broncos trailed 30–24 with 2:34 remaining in the game. The Broncos began their game-winning drive at their own 19-yard line. Following a pass interference penalty on Chargers' cornerback Brandon Facyson in the end zone on 4th-and-4 with one second remaining, Lock connected on a 1-yard touchdown pass to wide receiver K. J. Hamler as time expired, coupled with placekicker Brandon McManus kicking the subsequent game-winning extra point.
 December 27, 2020: The Chargers and Broncos had thir first matchup at SoFi Stadium. The Chargers, led by Justin Herbert, won the game 19–16, as kicker Michael Badgley converted a 37-yard field goal with 41 seconds remaining and the Chargers' defense intercepted the Broncos' last-second Hail Mary pass.

Game results

|-
| 1960
| style="| | style="| Chargers  23–19| style="| Chargers  41–33| Chargers  2–0
| Inaugural season for both franchises and the AFL. Chargers lose 1960 AFL Championship.
|-
| 1961
| style="| | style="| Chargers  19–16| style="| Chargers  37–0| Chargers  4–0
| Chargers relocate to San Diego after playing first season in Los Angeles. Chargers lose 1961 AFL Championship.
|-
| 1962
| style="| | style="| Broncos  30–21| style="| Broncos  23–20| Chargers  4–2
| 
|-
| 1963
| Tie 1–1| style="| Broncos  50–34| style="| Chargers  58–20| Chargers  5–3
| Chargers win 1963 AFL Championship.
|-
| 1964
| style="| | style="| Chargers  31–20| style="| Chargers  42–14| Chargers  7–3
| Chargers lose 1964 AFL Championship.
|-
| 1965
| style="| | style="| Chargers  34–31| style="| Chargers  35–21| Chargers  9–3
| Chargers lose 1965 AFL Championship.
|-
| 1966
| Tie 1–1| style="| Broncos  20–17| style="| Chargers  24–17| Chargers  10–4
| 
|-
| 1967
| style="| | style="| Chargers  38–21| style="| Chargers  24–20| Chargers  12–4
| Chargers open SDCCU Stadium (then known as San Diego Stadium).
|-
| 1968
| style="| | style="| Chargers  47–23| style="| Chargers  55–24| Chargers  14–4
| 
|-
| 1969
| Tie 1–1| style="| Broncos  13–0| style="| Chargers  45–24| Chargers  15–5
|

|-
| 
| style="| | Tie  17–17| style="| Chargers  24–21| Chargers  16–5–1
| AFL-NFL merger.  Both teams placed in AFC West. Only tie game in the history of the rivalry.
|-
| 
| Tie 1–1| style="| Broncos  20–16| style="| Chargers  45–17| Chargers  17–6–1
|
|-
| 
| Tie 1–1| style="| Broncos  38–13| style="| Chargers  37–14| Chargers  18–7–1
| Chargers win nine straight home meetings.
|-
| 
| style="| | style="| Broncos  30–19| style="| Broncos  42–28| Chargers  18–9–1
| 
|-
| 
| Tie 1–1| style="| Broncos  27–7| style="| Chargers  17–0| Chargers  19–10–1
| 
|-
| 
| style="| | style="| Broncos  13–10(OT)| style="| Broncos  27–17| Chargers  19–12–1
| 
|-
| 
| style="| | style="| Broncos  26–0| style="| Broncos  17–0| Chargers  19–14–1
| 
|-
| 
| style="| | style="| Broncos  17–9| style="| Broncos  17–14| Chargers  19–16–1
| Broncos lose Super Bowl XII.
|-
| 
| Tie 1–1| style="| Broncos  27–14| style="| Chargers  23–0| Chargers  20–17–1
| Broncos win seven straight meetings.
|-
| 
| Tie 1–1| style="| Broncos  7–0| style="| Chargers  17–7| Chargers  21–18–1
| Broncos win nine straight meetings in Denver.
|-

|-
| 
| Tie 1–1| style="| Chargers  30–13| style="| Broncos  20–13| Chargers  22–19–1
| 
|-
| 
| Tie 1–1| style="| Broncos  42–24| style="| Chargers  34–17| Chargers  23–20–1
| 
|-
| 
| style="| | style="| Chargers  23–3| style="| Chargers  23–3| Chargers  25–20–1
| Both meetings were played despite the players' strike which reduced the season to 9 games; Chargers' first season sweep since 1968.
|-
| 
| Tie 1–1| style="| Broncos  14–6| style="| Chargers  31–7| Chargers  26–21–1
| 
|-
| 
| style="| | style="| Broncos  16–13| style="| Broncos  16–13| Chargers  26–23–1
| 
|-
| 
| Tie 1–1| style="| Broncos  30–24(OT)| style="| Chargers  30–10| Chargers  27–24–1
| Broncos block a potential Chargers' game-winning field goal and return it for a touchdown to win the game in Denver.
|-
| 
| Tie 1–1| style="| Chargers  9–3| style="| Broncos  31–14| Chargers  28–25–1
| Broncos lose Super Bowl XXI.
|-
| 
| style="| | style="| Broncos  24–0| style="| Broncos  31–17| Chargers  28–27–1
| Broncos lose Super Bowl XXII.
|-
| 
| style="| | style="| Broncos  34–3| style="| Broncos  12–0| Broncos  29–28–1
| 
|-
| 
| Tie 1–1| style="| Broncos  16–10| style="| Chargers  19–16| Broncos  30–29–1
| Broncos lose Super Bowl XXIV.
|-

|-
| 
| Tie 1–1| style="| Broncos  20–10| style="| Chargers  19–7| Broncos  31–30–1
| 
|-
| 
| style="| | style="| Broncos  27–19| style="| Broncos  17–14| Broncos  33–30–1
| 
|-
| 
| Tie 1–1| style="| Broncos  21–13| style="| Chargers  24–21| Broncos  34–31–1
| 
|-
| 
| Tie 1–1| style="| Broncos  34–17| style="| Chargers  13–10| Broncos  35–32–1
| 
|-
| 
| Tie 1–1| style="| Chargers  37–34| style="| Broncos  20–15| Broncos  36–33–1
| Chargers lose Super Bowl XXIX.
|-
| 
| Tie 1–1| style="| Broncos  30–27| style="| Chargers  17–6| Broncos  37–34–1
|
|-
| 
| Tie 1–1| style="| Chargers  28–17| style="| Broncos  16–10| Broncos  38–35–1
|  
|-
| 
| style="| | style="| Broncos  38–3| style="| Broncos  38–28| Broncos  40–35–1
| Broncos win Super Bowl XXXII.
|-
| 
| style="| | style="| Broncos  27–10| style="| Broncos  31–16| Broncos  42–35–1
| Broncos win Super Bowl XXXIII.
|-
| 
| Tie 1–1| style="| Chargers  12–6| style="| Broncos  33–17| Broncos  43–36–1
| 
|-

|-
| 
| style="| | style="| Broncos  38–37| style="| Broncos  21–7| Broncos  45–36–1
| 
|-
| 
| Tie 1–1| style="| Broncos  26–16| style="| Chargers  27–10| Broncos  46–37–1
| Broncos open Empower Field at Mile High (then known as Invesco Field at Mile High).
|-
| 
| Tie 1–1| style="| Broncos  26–9| style="| Chargers  30–27(OT)| Broncos  47–38–1
| 
|-
| 
| style="| | style="| Broncos  37–8| style="| Broncos  37–13| Broncos  49–38–1
| Broncos wore white at home against the Chargers as punishment for bringing the wrong uniform in the first meeting earlier in the season.
|-
| 
| Tie 1–1| style="| Broncos  23–13| style="| Chargers  20–17| Broncos  50–39–1
| 
|-
| 
| style="| | style="| Broncos  20–17| style="| Broncos  23–7| Broncos  52–39–1
|
|-
| 
| style="| | style="| Chargers  35–27| style="| Chargers  48–20| Broncos  52–41–1
| Chargers' first season sweep since 1982.
|-
| 
| style="| | style="| Chargers  41–3| style="| Chargers  23–3| Broncos  52–43–1 
| 
|-
| 
| Tie 1–1| style="| Broncos  39–38| style="| Chargers  52–21| Broncos  53–44–1
| Broncos stun Chargers with controversial game-winning two-point conversion in Denver meeting; Chargers exact revenge in San Diego on final day of the season to clinch the AFC West, denying the Broncos a playoff berth.
|-
| 
| Tie 1–1| style="| Chargers  32–3| style="| Broncos  34–23| Broncos  54–45–1
| 
|-

|-
| 
| style="| | style="| Chargers  35–14| style="| Chargers  33–28| Broncos  54–47–1
| Most recent season sweep by the Chargers over the Broncos.
|-
| 
| Tie 1–1| style="| Chargers  29–24| style="| Broncos  16–13(OT)| Broncos  55–48–1 
| 
|-
| 
| style="| | style="| Broncos  30–23| style="| Broncos  35–24| Broncos  57–48–1
| Peyton Manning rallied Broncos from a 24–0 halftime deficit with 35 unanswered second-half points in San Diego meeting.
|-
| 
| Tie 1–1| style="| Chargers  27–20| style="| Broncos  28–20| Broncos  58–49–1 
| Broncos lose Super Bowl XLVIII.
|- style="background:#f2f2f2; font-weight:bold;"
|  2013 Playoffs
| style="| 
| style="| Broncos  24–17
| 
|  Broncos  59–49–1
|  AFC Divisional playoffs — Only playoff meeting between the two teams.
|-
| 
| style="| | style="| Broncos  35–21| style="| Broncos  22–10| Broncos  61–49–1
|
|-
| 
| style="| | style="| Broncos  27–20| style="| Broncos  17–3| Broncos  63–49–1
| Broncos win NFL-record 15 consecutive road division games with win in San Diego. Broncos clinch both the AFC West and home–field advantage in the AFC playoffs with their home win in week 17. Broncos win Super Bowl 50. 
|-
| 
| Tie 1–1| style="| Broncos  27–19| style="| Chargers  21–13| Broncos  64–50–1 
|
|-
| 
| Tie 1–1| style="| Broncos  24–21| style="| Chargers  21–0| Broncos  65–51–1 
| Chargers relocate from San Diego to Los Angeles; Broncos block game-tying field goal attempt at the end of regulation in Denver meeting; Chargers give Broncos their first shutout loss since 1992 in Los Angeles meeting.
|-
| 
| Tie 1–1| style="| Chargers  23–9| style="| Broncos  23–22| Broncos  66–52–1 
| Brandon McManus kicks game-winning field goal as time expired in Los Angeles meeting.
|-
| 
| style="| | style="| Broncos  23–20| style="| Broncos  20–13| Broncos  68–52–1
| Brandon McManus kicks game-winning field goal as time expired in Denver meeting.
|-

|-
| 
| Tie 1–1| style="| Broncos  31–30| style="| Chargers  19–16| Broncos  69–53–1
| Chargers open SoFi Stadium. Drew Lock rallied Broncos to game-winning touchdown as time expired and overcoming a 24–3 deficit in their home win.
|-
| 
| Tie 1–1| style="| Broncos  28–13| style="| Chargers  34–13| Broncos  70–54–1
| 
|-
| 
| Tie 1-1| style="|  Broncos  31–28| style="| Chargers  19–16(OT)| Broncos  71–55–1
| 
|
|- 

|-
| AFL regular season
| style="|Chargers 15–5| Chargers 6–4
| Chargers 9–1
|
|-
| NFL regular season
| style="|Broncos 65–40–1| Broncos 37–13–1
| Tied 27–27
| 
|-
| AFL and NFL regular season
| style="|Broncos 70–55–1| Broncos 42–19–1
| Chargers 36–28
| 
|-
| NFL postseason
| style="|Broncos 1–0| Broncos 1–0
| no games
| 2013 AFC Divisional playoffs
|-
| Regular and postseason 
| style="|Broncos 71–55–1'''
| Broncos 43–19–1
| Chargers 36–28
| 
|-

Connections between the teams

Coaches

Players

Series leaders 
Statistics limited to Chargers-Broncos regular season games. Correct through 2021 season.

Notes

References

External links
 Denver Broncos' official website
 The Denver Post – Complete Broncos Coverage
 Pro Football Hall of Fame – Denver Broncos team history
 Denver Broncos at Sports E-Cyclopedia.org
 Los Angeles Chargers' official website
 San Diego Union-Tribune – Chargers' coverage
 Los Angeles Chargers team history
 Los Angeles at Sports E-Cyclopedia.org

Denver Broncos
Los Angeles Chargers
National Football League rivalries
Denver Broncos rivalries
Los Angeles Chargers rivalries